WorshipMob is an American worship music collective from Colorado Springs, Colorado, and they were formed on March 15, 2011 by Sean Mulholland. They were signed to the Integrity Music label, releasing their first studio album, Carry the Fire, in 2015. This album was their breakthrough release upon the Billboard magazine Christian Albums and Heatseekers Albums charts.  

Capturing both scripted and unscripted moments of heart-felt worship, WorshipMob shares their video recordings on YouTube to a global audience of millions.  WorshipMob shares extended uncut spontaneous worship sessions, as well as covers of songs from Bethel, All Sons & Daughters, Hillsong and more.  The WorshipMob model is spreading with local groups gathering in cities throughout the US along with WorshipMob startups in Australia, Africa and the Philippines.

Music history
The collective's music recording career commenced in 2015, with the studio album, Carry the Fire, and it was released on March 3, 2015 by Integrity Music. This album was their breakthrough release upon the Billboard magazine charts, where it placed on the Christian Albums chart at No. 33 and on the Heatseekers Albums chart at No. 24.

Members
 Sean Mulholland
 70-80 ministry leaders from 30 local churches

Discography

References

External links
 Official website
 Christian Review Magazine article pages 36-39

Musical groups established in 2011
Musical groups from Colorado
American Christian musical groups
2011 establishments in Colorado